"Luna Nueva" (English: New Moon) is a song released by Colombian recording artist Carlos Vives as the second single from his fifth major studio album Déjame Entrar (2001) on December 10, 2001 (see 2002 in music). The song was written by Martín Madera and Vives, and produced by Emilio Estefan, Jr. and Sebastián Krys and became Vives' third number-one hit in the Billboard Hot Latin Songs chart following "Fruta Fresca" and "Déjame Entrar".

Critical reception 
While reviewing the parent album, Leila Cobo of Billboard magazine, referred to the musical genre of the song as a Son corrido. Vives earned the ASCAP award for the song and other two singles from Déjame Entrar, the title track and "Carito".

Chart performance
The song debuted in the Billboard Top Latin Songs chart (formerly Hot Latin Tracks) chart at number 45 the week of February 23, 2002, climbing to the top ten three weeks later. "Luna Nueva" peaked at number-one on March 23, 2002, replacing "Flor Sin Retoño" by fellow Colombian singer Charlie Zaa and being succeeded by "Quítame Ese Hombre" by Mexican performer Pilar Montenegro, the following week.

Charts

Weekly charts

Year-end charts

See also
 List of number-one Billboard Hot Latin Tracks of 2002
 List of number-one Billboard Latin Tropical Airplay of 2002

References

2002 singles
2001 songs
Carlos Vives songs
Spanish-language songs
Song recordings produced by Emilio Estefan
Songs written by Carlos Vives
EMI Latin singles